Garcés is a Spanish surname. Notable people with the surname include:
Carlos Antonio Bernardo Garcés (1900-1980), Mexican athlete
Carlos Garcés (born 1990), Ecuadorian football player 
Delia Garcés (1919–2001), Argentine film actress
Francisco Garcés (1738–1781), Spanish Franciscan missionary
Frank Garcés (born 1990), professional baseball player
Galindo Garcés (died 844), a Count of Aragón from 833 until his death in 844
Gloria Galeano Garcés (born 1958), Colombian botanist and agronomist
Jorge Garcés, (born 1954), Chilean football manager
José Luis Garcés (born 1981), Panamanian football forward
Mauricio Garcés (1926–1989), Mexican actor
Padre Francisco Garcés (1738–1781), Spanish Franciscan missionary
Paula Garcés (born 1974), film and television actress
Paulo Garcés (born 1984), Chilean football goalkeeper
Ramón José Sender Garcés (1901–1982), Aragonese Spanish novelist, essayist and journalist
Ramiro Garcés, Lord of Calahorra (died 1083), the second son of king García Sánchez III of Navarre and queen Stephania
Ramiro Garcés of Viguera (dead by 991) was the King of Viguera from 970 to his death
Rich Garcés (born 1971), former right-handed relief pitcher in Major League Baseball
Rubén Garcés (born 1973), Panamanian professional basketball player
Sans IV Gassia of Gascony (died 950 or 955), Duke of Gascony from 930 to his death
Tomàs Garcés (1901–1993), Catalan poet and lawyer
William Garcés of Fézensac (died 960), the first Count of Fézensac

See also
Jérôme Garcès (born 1973), French rugby referee